Michael Murphy (born January 15, 1989) is a Canadian former professional ice hockey goaltender. Murphy is currently an assistant coach for the Queen's Golden Gaels women's ice hockey. He last played with Dornbirner EC of the Austrian Hockey League (EBEL).

Murphy has the unique distinction of being the only goalie in league history to record a regulation loss before allowing a goal in his career, which he achieved during a 7–6 loss to the Calgary Flames on December 6, 2011.

Playing career
Murphy was selected by the Carolina Hurricanes in the sixth round of the 2008 NHL Entry Draft with the 165th overall pick. On March 18, 2009, he signed a three-year, entry-level contract with the Hurricanes. In 2007–08, Murphy led the Belleville Bulls to the finals of the J. Ross Robertson Cup, the OHL championship series, but they lost Game 7 to the Kitchener Rangers.

He became the first back-to-back winner of the OHL Goaltender of the Year award on April 27, 2009, after being awarded the honor for the second straight year.

On December 6, 2011, Murphy was temporarily promoted to the Carolina Hurricanes from their AHL affiliate, the Charlotte Checkers. That same night, Murphy became the first goalie in NHL history to record a loss before allowing his first NHL goal against.

On June 6, 2012, Murphy left the Hurricanes and signed a one-year deal in the Russian Kontinental Hockey League with Spartak Moscow. During the 2012–13 season, Murphy started in only 7 games with Spartak before opting for a release to return to the Charlotte Checkers on March 26, 2013.

On July 11, 2013, Murphy was officially returned to the Carolina Hurricanes system, signing to a one-year, two-way contract.

On June 16, 2014, Murphy opted to return to Europe in signing a one-year contract with Austrian club, Dornbirner EC of the EBEL. Murphy made 7 appearances for 1 win with the Bulldogs, before he was released from his contract on November 4, 2014.

Career statistics

Regular season and playoffs

Awards and honors
Named to the OHL First team All-Star in 2008.
OHL first All-rookie team award
OHL first All-star team award
OHL Dave Pinkney Trophy (top team goaltending)
Canadian major second All-star award
Canadian major junior goaltender of the year
2008 OHL Goaltender of the Year
2009 OHL Goaltender of the Year
2009 CHL Goaltender of the Year

References

External links
 

1989 births
Albany River Rats players
Belleville Bulls players
Canadian ice hockey goaltenders
Carolina Hurricanes draft picks
Carolina Hurricanes players
Charlotte Checkers (2010–) players
Dornbirn Bulldogs players
HC Spartak Moscow players
Ice hockey people from Ontario
Living people
People from Frontenac County
Canadian expatriate ice hockey players in Austria
Canadian expatriate ice hockey players in Russia